Irish Switch, also called Two-four Jacks, Lives or Black Jack, is a version of the card game Switch popular in Ireland. It is very similar to the original with a few rule changes. Switch is  a shedding-type card game for two or more players that is popular in the United Kingdom, and as alternative incarnations in other regions. The sole aim of switch is to discard all of the cards in one's hand; the first player to play the final held card, and ergo have no cards left, wins the game. Switch is very similar to the games Uno and Mau Mau, both belonging to the larger Crazy Eights family of shedding games.

Object
Switch is played with a regular, single deck of playing cards, or with two standard decks (shuffled into one) if there are a large number of players.

Each player at his turn may play any card from his/her hand that matches the suit or the rank of the card previously played; for example, if the previous card was a six of clubs, the next player may put down any six card, or any club card, from his/her hand. Should the player not have any card available to play, s/he must pick up one card.

Game rules
Players are initially dealt a similar sized hand of cards (often 9 per person when 4 or less, 7 if 4+). The remainder of the deck is placed face down and serve as a "pool" or drawing stack. At the beginning of the game the topmost card from the "pool" is revealed and, so long as this card is not a trick card, play begins. (Switch may not start with a trick card, and so if the "starting card" is a trick card, cards shall continue to be selected from the pool until a non-trick card is revealed.)

The first to play (generally, the player on the dealer's left) should select from his or her hand a card that matches either, the suit or the rank of the open card (the card that is "top"); for example, on a 10 of spades, only a spade card or a 10 may be played. If a player is not able to place a card, he draws cards from the stack until he is able to play a card.

If the drawing stack is run down and becomes empty, the playing stack or discard pile (except for the topmost card) is shuffled, and placed face down to become the new "pool."

Power cards
In switch, some cards are known as "power" or "trick" cards, because their being played directly affects the gameplay:

2: if a player places a two (of any suit) down, the next player is required to pick up two cards. Should that player have a two himself, however, he may place it down, requiring the next player to pick up four; if they have a two, he may place it, requiring the next player to pick up six; this may continue until the flow reaches a player who does not have a two in his or her hand, at which point he is required to pick up the required number of cards. A player that draws cards after a two has been played is usually not permitted to put any more cards down.
King of Hearts: Requires a player to pick up seven cards, unless they have the 2 of hearts. Then they may pick up seven cards and another 2 card makes them pick up nine and so on.
Ace: Can be placed on any card of the same suit, e.g. an Ace of Spades can be placed on top of any other Spades card. When playing an ace, the player can decide freely the suit that has to be played next; from then on, play continues as normal, but on the suit selected by the player of the ace.
Joker: A Joker card can be used in play, but is not necessary for the game. The Joker acts as a replacement card, i.e. it can be any card from any suit. Although, playing with these cards can make the game too easy and boring.
7: a player may skip a turn once the other player puts down at 7 of any suit, the next player can place another 7 down to make the next player skip, multiple people can put a 7 down, this action happens until no one has a 7, making them skip their turn. 
Jack: a Jack is used in play so the player can reverse to the previous player, one player may put down multiple jacks at the same time, if there are only two players in the game one player will put a jack down, making it reverse to themself, they can then put another card down on top of it.

When a player has only one remaining card they must remember to call last card (by saying last card aloud) before their turn has ended, to inform the other players that they are about to win. Should a player who has graduated to last card fail to call before the end of the turn in which they reach last card (that is, once the next player has started his or her turn after the last-card player has put down his or her second last card), they may be penalised, often to the cost of picking up two card's immediately (over and above any picking up as a matter of routine course in the game).

Endgame
As soon as a player plays their last card they win the game. A player cannot finish on a trick card. If their last card is a trick card they must pick up a card from the deck and cannot play the trick card. The game can continue until all the players get rid of their cards.

Player turns
On each turn, the player attempts to place cards from their hand onto the stack.
A card can only be placed in the stack if it matches either the rank or suit of the top card.
A player can place consecutive cards of the same suit down to remove more cards.
If a player cannot take their turn, they pick up a card from the remaining deck.
Once the player has played their turn, they must say "Last card" if they only have one card left. If you think that you can finish your cards in one turn you say "cards" If they fail to do so, there is a penalty

The deck
J28 is played with a standard 52-card pack of playing cards or if there is a large number of people playing one game then two packs may be mixed together and dealt as normal.

Dealing
Dealership alternates from round to round (the dealer to the first round is usually determined by cutting the deck and then the lowest card deals). The dealer deals a seven-card hand to each player. After seven cards are dealt the next card is placed face up in the centre of the table, this is the discard pile. The remainder of the pack is placed face down next to the discard pile, and is called the stock.

The next non-dealing player to the right of the dealer lays the first card.

Notes

Shedding-type card games